TwinsUK, also known as TwinsUK Registry, is the biggest UK adult registry of twins in the United Kingdom, ages 16 to 98 to study the genetic and environmental aetiology of age related complex traits and diseases. Established in 1993, it is based at King's College London with an intent of aiding genetic research. The registry is used to connect researchers to volunteers.

It is the largest registry of twin adults in the UK. As of 2013, it hosted information on more than 13,000 volunteer twins, with approximately 50% having completed a baseline comprehensive assessment and more than 70% having completed a detailed health questionnaire. As of 2013, the cohort was predominantly female (83%) and middle-aged or older, with about an equal division of monozygotic and dizygotic twins.

See also
Twins Early Development Study

References

Research institutes in London
Twin registries
Genetics databases
1992 establishments in the United Kingdom
Organizations established in 1992